Jafreen Shaik Jafreen (born 7 September 1997) is a deaf Indian tennis player. She represented India at the Deaflympics in 2013 and 2017. She claimed a bronze medal in the mixed doubles at the 2017 Summer Deaflympics partnering with Prithvi Sekhar.

Career 
Jafreen started playing tennis when she was just eight years old. She went on to become a formidable tennis player despite being deaf, after being noticed by India's best female tennis player, Sania Mirza, and gaining assistance from her, receiving training at the Sania Mirza Tennis Academy which is located in Hyderabad.

She went on to represent India at the 2013 Summer Deaflympics which was also her first Deaflympic appearance. As in the as of  Prithvi Sekhar, she did not win a medal in her debut Deaflympic event. She was chosen to compete for India at the 2017 Summer Deaflympics as India sent a delegation consisting of 46 participants for the multi-sport event, the largest number of athletes sent by India to a single Summer Deaflympics. Jafreen Shaik along with Prithvi Sekhar won a historical bronze medal in the mixed doubles at the 2017 Summer Deaflympics, marking India's first ever Deaflympic medal in tennis.

References

External links 
 
 
 Shaik Jafreen Jafreen at TennisExplorer
 Jafreen Shaik Jafreen at CoreTennis

1997 births
Living people
Indian female tennis players
Deaf tennis players
Indian deaf people
Sportswomen from Telangana
Racket sportspeople from Hyderabad, India